Tony Pua Kiam Wee (born 1 August 1972) is a Malaysian politician who served as the Member of Parliament (MP) for Damansara from May 2018 to November 2022, for Petaling Jaya Utara from March 2008 to May 2018 and Political Secretary to the Minister of Finance from May 2018 to February 2020. He is a member of the Democratic Action Party (DAP), a component party of presently the  Pakatan Harapan (PH) and formerly Pakatan Rakyat (PR) coalitions. He has also served as Policy Advisor to the Secretary-General of DAP since May 2022. 

Pua is the former Malaysian CEO of Cyber Village Sdn Bhd, a SESDAQ (SGX second board)-listed company. In early 2007, he disposed of all his interests in the company and tendered his resignation to join the DAP in 2008.

Pua graduated from Keble College, Oxford with a degree in Philosophy, Politics and Economics under a scholarship from the MTC Foundation in 1994. Before that, he received Asean and Shaw Foundation scholarships to pursue his O- and A-Levels in Raffles Institution and Raffles Junior College, in Singapore.

In the 2008 Malaysian general election, Pua won the parliamentary constituency of Petaling Jaya Utara on a DAP ticket. He ran against the incumbent, Chew Mei Fun, then Parliamentary Secretary to the Ministry of Women, Family and Community Development, and Deputy Women Chief of the Malaysian Chinese Association (MCA). In 2009, Pua was appointed the DAP member of the Pakatan Rakyat (PR) committee.

Pua retained his parliamentary seat in 2018 general election with a majority of 106,903, the largest majority in Malaysian history.

Education
Pua attended a secondary school in Singapore on an ASEAN scholarship from the Singaporean government. He attended Raffles Institution and Raffles Junior College. He then went to Oxford University, England, where he studied philosophy, politics and economics at Keble College on an MTC Foundation scholarship.

Early career
After graduating from Oxford University, Pua worked for Andersen Consulting (now Accenture) as a consultant. In March 1997, he started Cyber Village, an e-business consultancy. Pua and three friends opened an office in Kuala Lumpur with four staff.

Member of Parliament
On 9 November 2008, Pua was arrested during a candlelight vigil in Petaling Jaya to commemorate the first anniversary of the Bersih street demonstration. Pua was released on police bail on the morning of 10 November 2008 and was later charged for illegal assembly.

On 10 August 2010, Pua received a live 5.56mm bullet along with a threatening note that were mailed to his constituency service centre. Pua stated that the threat may have been related to his proposal to the Selangor government to cut Bumiputera discounts for homes and commercial property priced above RM 500,000 in the state.

Defamation lawsuit
On 28 January 2011, Syarikat Bekalan Air Selangor (SYABAS) filed a lawsuit against Pua claiming he had permitted Nanyang Siang Pau's Metro edition to publish words defamatory of it. The article quoted him saying the Selangor state government should take over the rights of management of water supply in the state if water concessionaires could not settle their debts. Syabas claimed the report had brought  the company into public scandal and its image had been tarnished. The lawsuit sought an injunction to prevent Pua or his agents from publishing defamatory words against the company, and general damages and cost.

Pua argued that Syabas, as a public authority performing a public service, had no locus standi in making a defamation claim. He also said he had a legal, moral and social duty as an MP and a member of the Selangor government Water Review Panel to publish those words and that the public had a right to know. Pua also filed a counter-suit claiming Syabas' suit was frivolous, vexatious and amounted to an abuse of the court process, which resulted in him suffering losses and unnecessary harassment and expenses.

On 6 June 2012, the Malaysian High Court found that SYABAS had proven its case against Pua and ordered him to pay RM200,000 in damages to SYABAS and awarded SYABAS interest at the rate of 4% per annum from the date of judgment till full payment and also costs. Justice Amelia Tee Hong Geok Abdullah also struck out Pua's counter-claim application and granted SYABAS an injunction to restrain Pua and his agents from further publishing or giving permission to be published "similar defamatory words" against SYABAS. Pua later stated on his blog that he maintains "that the above statement is not defamatory, and will instruct my lawyers to file an appeal in the Court of Appeal".

On 7 July 2012, Pua posted on his blog that although an appeal was underway, he was required to pay the amount of RM200,000 to SYABAS by 16 July 2012. DAP Malaysia subsequently initiated a mass fundraising campaign titled "RM1 for Water Rights: 100,000 Malaysians Support Tony Pua vs Syabas" calling for 100,000 Malaysians to donate RM1 each to help Pua pay for the damages to SYABAS.

He subsequently won the Court of Appeal case. SYABAS appealed the decision to the Federal Court of Malaysia. In the 2015 Federal Court case ([2015] 6 MLJ 187), Pua won the appeal based on the Lucas-Box principle by providing his own reasonable meaning to the impugned words.

Publications
The Tiger that Lost its Roar, a tale of Malaysia's political economy.

Election results

Policies

In 2012, Pua suggested that the Bumiputera discount for housing and real estate must be abolished for houses above RM500,000. He disagreed with giving discounts on expensive houses such as those priced at or above RM 1 million.

In one of his statements,  Pua said the government should reduce the number of civil servants. His idea was rejected by PKR leader Anwar Ibrahim as impractical. Pua said he wants to make the government sector become more efficient and less costly.

Pua was invited by the organizers of the recent startup acceleration program held at Dewan Sivik.

See also
 Damansara (federal constituency)

References

External links

 
 EDUCATION IN MALAYSIA, an education-oriented blog written by Tony Pua and Kian Ming Ong.

1972 births
Raffles Institution alumni
Raffles Junior College alumni
Democratic Action Party (Malaysia) politicians
Living people
Malaysian businesspeople
People from Batu Pahat
People from Johor
21st-century Malaysian politicians
Malaysian politicians of Chinese descent
Members of the Dewan Rakyat
Alumni of Keble College, Oxford
Malaysian people of Teochew descent